Ustya is an alternative name of several rural localities in Moscow Oblast, Russia:
Ustya, alternative name of Ust-Pristan, a village in Bolsherogachevskoye Rural Settlement of Dmitrovsky District; 
Ustya, alternative name of Ustye, a village in Volchenkovskoye Rural Settlement of Naro-Fominsky District;